Ouachita may refer to:

Places
In the United States:
 Ouachita, Arkansas, an unincorporated community
 Ouachita City, Louisiana, an unincorporated community
 The Ouachita Mountains in Arkansas and Oklahoma
 The Ouachita orogeny, the geologic event that raised the Ouachita Mountains
 The Ouachita River in Arkansas and Louisiana
 Lake Ouachita
 Ouachita County, Arkansas
 Ouachita Parish, Louisiana 
 Ouachita National Forest in Arkansas and Oklahoma
 Ouachita National Recreation Trail in Arkansas and Oklahoma

Native Americans
 The Ouachita people, a Caddo group from northeastern Louisiana

Education
 Ouachita Baptist University, a private liberal arts institution in Arkansas
 Ouachita Hills College, a missionary training college in southwest Arkansas

Business
 Ouachita Railroad, a Class III short-line railroad headquartered in Arkansas
 Ouachita Electric Cooperative, a rural electric utility cooperative

Nature
 Ouachita creekshell, a species of mussel
 Ouachita dusky salamander, a species of salamander
 Ouachita madtom, a species of catfish
 Ouachita map turtle, a species of turtle
 Ouachita pebblesnail, a species of snail
 Ouachita rock pocketbook, another species of mussel
 Ouachita shiner, a species of minnow
 Ouachita streambed salamander, another species of salamander
 Ouachita burrowing crayfish
 Ouachita Fencing Crayfish
 Ouachita Mountain Crayfish
 Ouachita River Crayfish

See also
Wichita (disambiguation)
Washita (disambiguation)